The year 1925 in architecture involved some significant events.

Events
 April–October – International Exhibition of Modern Decorative and Industrial Arts (Exposition Internationale des Arts Décoratifs et Industriels Modernes) in Paris.
 May 25 – Second Madison Square Garden (the version built 1890 and designed by Stanford White) is closed on this date and demolished shortly after.
 St. Bernard de Clairvaux Church (12th century) is shipped from Sacramenia, Segovia, Spain to the United States by William Randolph Hearst.

Buildings and structures

Buildings opened
 November 18 – Willard Straight Hall, Cornell University, designed by Delano & Aldrich opens. 4,800 people come to see the building on opening day, followed by 3,000 people the next day.

Buildings completed

 Mount Pleasant Library (Washington, D.C.), designed by Edward Lippincott Tilton, opens.
 Great Synagogue (Tel Aviv), designed by Yehuda Magidovitch, is completed.
 Administration Building at Texas Technological College (modern-day Texas Tech University) in Lubbock, Texas, designed by Wyatt C. Hedrick, opens.
 Altare della Patria (Monumento Nazionale a Vittorio Emanuele II) in Rome, designed by Giuseppe Sacconi (died 1905) in 1884, is completed.
 Uppståndelsekapellet (Resurrection Chapel), Skogskyrkogården (Woodland Cemetery), Stockholm, Sweden, designed by Sigurd Lewerentz, is built.
 Villa Le Trident at Théoule-sur-Mer on the French Riviera, designed by Barry Dierks, is built.
 Government House of Thailand, in Bangkok, then known as Baan Norasingha, designed by Corrado Feroci.

Awards
 AIA Gold Medal – Edwin Lutyens; Bertram Goodhue.
 RIBA Royal Gold Medal – Giles Gilbert Scott.
 Prix de Rome, architecture: Alfred Audoul.

Births

 January 14 – Aarno Ruusuvuori, Finnish architect (died 1992)
 January 17 – Gunnar Birkerts, Latvian American architect (died 2017)
 April 6 – Paul Ritter, Australian architect, town planner, sociologist, artist and author (died 2010)
 May 18 – Justus Dahinden, Swiss architect and writer
 May 31 – Frei Otto, German Pritzker Prize-winning architect and structural engineer (died 2015)
 June 25 – Robert Venturi, American Pulitzer Prize-winning architect (died 2018)
 August 20 – Henning Larsen, Danish architect (died 2013)

Deaths
 January 8 – Stewart Henbest Capper, British Arts and Crafts architect (born 1859)
 April 13 – August Endell, German Jugendstil architect and designer (born 1871)
 September 13 – Emily Elizabeth Holman, American architect (born 1854)
 December 26 – Jan Letzel, Czech architect (born 1880)

References